Theaters of War is a 2022 American documentary film that examines the influence of the Pentagon and CIA in shaping Hollywood and television scripts, making use of the Freedom of Information Act to acquire internal state files.  The film also features interviews with academics, government officials, veterans, and industry players including Oliver Stone.

Production
The film is directed and narrated by Communication Studies professor Roger Stahl.  The co-producers are Matthew Alford, Tom Secker, and Sebastian Kaempf.  The film is partially based on Alford and Secker's 2017 book National Security Cinema.

Reception
After selling on online platforms, Theaters of War had its festival premiere at the Lone Star Film Festival in 2022. In a preview, Counterpunch called it a "fantastic new film [which performs] an important public service" On the film's release, Stahl wrote an editorial for the LA Times. Comedian Alexei Sayle discussed the film's content before joking about how the CIA would rewrite ITV's soap opera Emmerdale.

References 

American documentary films
2022 films
2020s English-language films
2022 documentary films